Treaty of St. Peters may be one of two treaties conducted between the United States and Native American peoples, conducted at the confluence of the Minnesota River (then called "St. Peters River") with the Mississippi River, in what today is Mendota, Minnesota.

1805 Treaty of St. Peters 

The 1805 Treaty of St. Peters or the Treaty with the Sioux, better known as Pike's Purchase, was a treaty conducted between Lieutenant Zebulon Pike for the United States and Chiefs "Le Petit Carbeau" and Way Aga Enogee on behalf of the Sioux Nation.  The treaty conducted on September 23, 1805, purchases two tracts of land: nine-square miles each at the confluence of the St. Croix River about what now is Hastings, Minnesota and confluence of the Minnesota River with Mississippi about what now is Mendota, Minnesota, for the purposes of establishing military posts at each of the two sites.  A military post was not established at the confluence of the St. Croix with the Mississippi, but Fort Snelling was established on the bluffs overlooking the confluence of the Minnesota with the Mississippi.  Though the treaty was never proclaimed by the President of the United States, it was ratified by the United States Congress on April 16, 1808.

1837 Treaty of St. Peters

The 1837 Treaty of St. Peters or the Treaty with the Chippewa (or informally as the White Pine Treaty) was a treaty conducted between Governor Henry Dodge for the United States and representatives from Ojibwa bands located across today's Wisconsin and Minnesota. It was conducted on July 29, 1837, at St. Peters, Wisconsin Territory (known today as Mendota, Minnesota). Signatory tribes commonly call this treaty The Treaty of 1837.

Land Cession Terms 

In the treaty, the Ojibwa nations ceded to the United States a large tract of land located from the Mississippi River in east-central Minnesota to the Wisconsin River in northern Wisconsin, using as its southern boundaries the "Prairie du Chien Line" as established by the 1825 First Treaty of Prairie du Chien, between the Dakota and the Ojibwa, and using the Lake Superior watershed as its northern boundaries.

The land cession was conducted to guarantee access to the Wisconsin Territory's lumber resources that was needed to help build housing for the growing populations in St. Louis, Missouri and Cleveland, Ohio.  In the sale, the United States obligated itself to payments to the signatory Bands for twenty years and additional provisions for the Metis in the territory.  In turn, the signatory Ojibwa bands retained usufructuary rights to continue hunting, fishing and gathering within the treaty-ceded territory.

Signatories 

{|class="wikitable sortable"
|-
! # !! Location !! Recorded Name!! Name (Translation/"Alias") !! Title
|-
| 01 || Leech Lake || Aish-ke-bo-ge-koshe || Eshkibagikoonzhe (Flat Mouth) || Chief
|-
| 02 || Leech Lake || R-che-o-sau-ya  || Gichi-osayenh (Elder Brother) || Chief
|-
| 03 || Leech Lake || Pe-zhe-kins || Bizhikiins (Young Buffalo) || Warrior
|-
| 04 || Leech Lake || Ma-ghe-ga-bo  || Nayaajigaabaw ("la Trappe") || Warrior
|-
| 05 || Leech Lake || O-be-gwa-dans || (Chief of the Earth) || Warrior
|-
| 06 || Leech Lake || Wa-bose || Waabooz (Rabbit) || Warrior
|-
| 07 || Leech Lake || Che-a-na-quod || Chi-aanakwad (Big Cloud) || Warrior
|-
| 08 || Gull Lake and Swan River || Pa-goo-na-kee-zhig || Bagone-giizhig (Hole in the Day) || Chief
|-
| 09 || Gull Lake and Swan River || Songa-ko-mig || Zoongakamig (Strong Ground) || Chief
|-
| 10 || Gull Lake and Swan River || Wa-boo-jig || Waabojiig (White Fisher) || Warrior
|-
| 11 || Gull Lake and Swan River || Ma-cou-da || Makode''' (Bear's Heart) || Warrior
|-
| 12 || St. Croix River || Pe-zhe-ke || Bizhikiinh (Buffalo) || Chief
|-
| 13 || St. Croix River || Ka-be-ma-be || Gaa-bimabi (He that sits to the side/"Wet mouth") || Chief
|-
| 14 || St. Croix River || Pa-ga-we-we-wetung || Bigiiwewewidang (Coming Home Hollering) || Warrior
|-
| 15 || St. Croix River || Ya-banse || Ayaabens (Young Buck) || Warrior
|-
| 16 || St. Croix River || Kis-ke-ta-wak || Giishkitawag (Cut Ear) || Warrior
|-
| 17 || Lac Courte Oreilles Band || Pa-qua-a-mo || Bakwe'aamoo (Woodpecker) || Chief
|-
| 18 || Lac du Flambeau Band || Pish-ka-ga-ghe || Apishkaagaagi (Magpie/"White Crow") || Chief
|-
| 19 || Lac du Flambeau Band || Na-wa-ge-wa  ||  (Knee) || Chief
|-
| 20 || Lac du Flambeau Band || O-ge-ma-ga  || Ogimaakaanh (Dandy) || Chief
|-
| 21 || Lac du Flambeau Band || Pa-se-quam-jis  || (Commissioner) || Chief
|-
| 22 || Lac du Flambeau Band || Wa-be-ne-me  || Waabanimikii (White Thunder) || Chief
|-
| 23 || La Pointe Band || Pe-zhe-ke || Bizhiki (Buffalo) || Chief
|-
| 24 || La Pointe Band || Ta-qua-ga-na || Dagwagaane (Two Lodges Meet) || Chief
|-
| 25 || La Pointe Band || Cha-che-que-o  || Jechiikwii'o (Snipe) || Chief
|-
| 26 || Mille Lacs Indians || Wa-shask-ko-kone || Wazhashkokon (Muskrat's Liver) || Chief
|-
| 27 || Mille Lacs Indians || Wen-ghe-ge-she-guk || Wenji-giizhigak (First Day) || Chief
|-
| 28 || Mille Lacs Indians || Ada-we-ge-shik || Edawi-giizhig (Both Ends of the Sky) || Warrior
|-
| 29 || Mille Lacs Indians || Ka-ka-quap || Gekekwab ([Sitting on a] Sparrow[hawk]) || Warrior
|-
| 30 || Sandy Lake Band || Ka-nan-da-wa-win-zo || Gaa-nandawaawinzo (Ripe-Berry Hunter/"le Brocheux") || Chief
|-
| 31 || Sandy Lake Band || We-we-shan-shis  || Gwiiwizhenzhish (Bad Boy/"Big Mouth") || Chief
|-
| 32 || Sandy Lake Band || Ke-che-wa-me-te-go || Gichi-wemitigo (Big Frenchman) || Chief
|-
| 33 || Sandy Lake Band || Na-ta-me-ga-bo || Netamigaabaw (Stands First) || Warrior
|-
| 34 || Sandy Lake Band || Sa-ga-ta-gun || Zagataagan (Spunk) || Warrior
|-
| 35 || Snake River || Naudin || Noodin (Wind) || Chief
|-
| 36 || Snake River || Sha-go-bai || Zhaagobe ("Little" Six) || Chief
|-
| 37 || Snake River || Pay-ajik || Bayezhig (Lone Man) || Chief
|-
| 38 || Snake River || Na-qua-na-bie || Negwanebi ([Tallest Quill-]Feather) || Chief
|-
| 39 || Snake River || Ha-tau-wa  || Odaawaa (Trader/"Ottawa") || Warrior
|-
| 40 || Snake River || Wa-me-te-go-zhins || Wemitigoozhiins (Little Frenchman) || Warrior
|-
| 41 || Snake River || Sho-ne-a || Zhooniyaa (Silver) || Warrior
|-
| 42 || Fond du Lac Band || Mang-go-sit || Maangozid (Loon's Foot) || Chief
|-
| 43 || Fond du Lac Band || Shing-go-be || Zhingobiinh (Spruce) || Chief
|-
| 44|| Red Cedar Lake || Mont-so-mo ||  (Murdering Yell) ||
|-
| 45 || Red Lake || Francois Goumean  || François Gourneau || half breed
|-
| 46 || Leech Lake || Sha-wa-ghe-zhig ||  Zhinawaagiizhig ([Re]sounding Sky) || Warrior
|-
| 47 || Leech Lake || Wa-zau-ko-ni-a || Wezaawikonaye (Yellow Robe) || Warrior
|}

Commissioner:
 Henry Dodge, Commissioner
Recording Secretary:
 Verplanck Van Antwerp, Secretary to the Commissioner
Indian Agents:
 Lawrence Taliaferro, US Indian Agent at St. Peters
 Miles M. Vineyard, US Sub-Indian Agent at Crow Wing, Minnesota
 Daniel P. Bushnell, US Sub-Indian Agent at La Pointe, Wisconsin
Interpreters:
 John Baptiste DuBay
 Peter Quinn
 Scott Campbell
 Stephen Bonga
Army:
 Martin Scott, Captain, Fifth Regiment Infantry
 Dr. John Emerson, Assistant Surgeon, US Army
Traders:
 Hercules L. Dousman
 Henry Hastings Sibley
 Lyman Marquis Warren of La Pointe, Wisconsin
Special guests:
 Jean Nicholas Nicollet
Others:
 Harmen Van Antwerp
 William W. Coriell
 William H. Forbes
 Ezekiel Lockwood of Prairie du Chien, Wisconsin
 Samuel C. Stambaugh of Green Bay, Wisconsin

In addition, two other known people were in attendance, but were not signatories:
 William A. Aitken
 Allan Morrison

 Establishment of Reservations 

Together with the 1842 and 1854 treaty-ceded territories in determining the locations of Indian Reservations in the 1854 Treaty of La Pointe and the 1855 Treaty of Washington, the 1837 treaty-ceded territory was divided into five zones.  Charles Royce in his 1899 report and accompanying map to the United States Congress designated the territory as "Land Cession Area No. 242," thus the area is often called "Royce Area 242."  The five zones each with proposed centralized Indian Reservations of approximately  each were Mille Lacs Lake (242A), St. Croix (242B), Lac Courte Oreilles (242C), Lac du Flambeau (242D) and Mole Lake (242E), with access accommodations made for Fond du Lac, La Pointe and Lac Vieux Desert.  

However, with St. Croix and Sokoagon walking out of the negotiations of the 1854 Treaty of La Pointe, they were excluded from further business, losing their federal recognition until 1934, and the proposed St. Croix Indian Reservation was never established in zone 242B and Mole Lake was never established straddling zone 242E and 1842 treaty-ceded territory. In the case of St. Croix, illness overcame the Chief Ayaabens and the United States would not accept a sub-Chief vested with negotiation authority, so St. Croix had no choice but to walk away; oral history of both the St. Croix Chippewa Indians of Minnesota of the Mille Lacs Band of Ojibwe and the St. Croix Chippewa Indians of Wisconsin both state if it were not for Chief Ayaabens’ illness, the St. Croix Band would have insisted on reaffirmation of treaty rights expressed in both the 1837 Treaty of St. Peters and the 1842 Treaty of La Pointe, so that the Band would not be face with loss of off-Reservation resources access. Shortly afterwards, Chief Ayaabens died from his illness. The Mole Lake Chief sent his sub-Chief to the Treaty council, with full negotiation authority, but like St. Croix, United States would not accept Mole Lake's sub-Chief, even when fully vested with negotiation authority, leaving the Mole Lake delegation no other choice but to walk away from Treaty council. However, Mille Lacs Lake and Lac Courte Oreilles Indian Reservations were established in 242A and 242C respectively, and Lac du Flambeau Indian Reservations was established straddling zone 242D and 1842 treaty-ceded territory.

 Treaty area boundary adjustments 

In Wisconsin, for regulatory purposes, the southern boundaries of the 1837 treaty-area have been adjusted to follow distinct landmarks such as roads and streams.  However, in Wisconsin with consent of the property-owner and with tribally issued license, all treaty rights of hunting, fishing and gathering may be exercised by the members of the signatory bands.

In Minnesota, no boundary adjustments have been made.  However, hunting is limited to public lands located within the 1837 treaty-area and requires tribally issued hunting license.  For non-public lands within the 1837 treaty-area, hunting is subjectable to state hunting licensing and rules.  For fishing and gathering, tribally issued licenses are required in Minnesota's portion of the 1837 treaty-ceded territory.

 1851 Treaty of St. Peters 
See Treaty of Mendota

See also

Lac Courte Oreilles Band of Lake Superior Chippewa Indians v. Wisconsin
Minnesota v. Mille Lacs Band of Chippewa Indians,  

Notes

References

Zapffe, Carl A. Minnesota's Chippewa Treaty of 1837. 

Further reading

 McClurken, James M. (2000).  Fish in the Lakes, Wild Rice and Game in abundance''.  East Lansing: Michigan State University Press.

External links 
 Digital copy of the 1805 treaty
 Digital copy of the 1837 treaty
 Mille Lacs Band of Chippewa Indians v. Minnesota (1994)

Ojibwe in the United States
Sioux
St. Peters
Anishinaabe treaty areas
Pre-statehood history of Wisconsin
Native American history of Minnesota
1805 treaties
1837 treaties